Timme is a given name and surname. Notable people with the name include:

Given name
Timme Hoyng (born 1976), Dutch field hockey player
Timme Rosenkrantz (1911–1969), Danish aristocrat, author and jazz enthusiast

Surname
Drew Timme (born 2000), American basketball player
Ernst Timme (1843–1923), American politician
Herman Timme (born 1933), Dutch decathlete

See also
Timmie, given name